Gösta Theselius (June 9, 1922 in Stockholm – January 24, 1976 in Stockholm) was a Swedish arranger, composer, film scorer, pianist, and saxophonist. His brother was musician Hans Theselius.

Theselius worked in the 1940s with a number of European big bands, including those of Thore Jederby, Hakan von Eichwald, Sam Samson, Lulle Elboj, and Thore Ehrling. He played jazz into the 1950s, both as a saxophonist and a pianist (on the latter instrument with Benny Bailey, Arne Domnerus, James Moody, and Charlie Parker), and composed copiously for film in the 1950s and 1960s.

Film soundtracks
1942 – Olycksfågeln nr 13
1951 – Uppdrag i Korea
1955 – Flicka i kasern
1955 –  Paradise
1956 – Suss gott
1956 – The Stranger from the Sky 
1956 – Flamman
1956 – Blånande hav
1957 – The Halo Is Slipping
1957 – Räkna med bråk
1960 – Kärlekens decimaler
1961 – Karneval
1961 – Två levande och en död

References

Swedish jazz saxophonists
Male saxophonists
Swedish jazz pianists
Swedish composers
Swedish male composers
Musicians from Stockholm
Male pianists
Male jazz musicians
1922 births
1976 deaths
20th-century Swedish male musicians
20th-century saxophonists